Joe Dickson (31 January 1934 – 1990) was an English footballer who played for Liverpool.

External links
 
 LFC History profile

1934 births
English footballers
Liverpool F.C. players
1990 deaths
Association football inside forwards
English Football League players
Footballers from Liverpool
Oxford United F.C. players
Date of death missing